Roland Schimmelpfennig (born 19 September 1967) is a German theatre director and playwright. His plays are performed in more than 40 countries.

Biography
Schimmelpfennig was born in Gottingen. He began his career as a journalist in Istanbul, but starting in 1990 he studied at the Otto Falckenberg School of the Performing Arts to be a theatre director. He is one of Germany's most prolific playwrights, widely praised in Europe but relatively obscure in the United States. His work is said to vary from "kaleidoscopic" and dreamlike to naturalistic. He lives in the Eastern part of Berlin with his wife. Two of his plays, translated as Push Up and The Woman Before, have been performed at the Royal Court Theatre in London. His play Ant Street was staged as part of Volta International Festival at the Arcola Theatre in 2015.

He wrote the libretto for the opera Der goldene Drache by Péter Eötvös, composed and premiered in 2014, based on his 2010 play. Schimmelpfennig's debut novel, An einem klaren eiskalten Januarmorgen zu Beginn des 21. Jahrhunderts was translated into English by Jamie Bulloch and published by MacLehose Press in 2018 as One Clear, Ice-Cold January Morning at the Beginning of the Twenty-First Century.

Awards 
2010 Mülheimer Dramatikerpreis
2010 Else Lasker-Schüler Dramatist Prize
2009 and 2002 Nestroy Theatre Prize

References 

German theatre directors
German musical theatre librettists
German radio writers
Writers from Göttingen
1967 births
Living people
German male dramatists and playwrights
20th-century German dramatists and playwrights
21st-century German dramatists and playwrights